"Reach 4 Me" is a song by American recording group En Vogue. Written by Dwayne Abernathy and Isabella Peschardt, "Reach 4 Me" was produced by Abernathy under his pseudonym Dem Jointz and released as the second single from their seventh studio album Electric Café (2018). In the United States, the song peaked at number 16 on Billboards Adult R&B Songs chart, making it the second top 20 appearance by a single from Electric Café.

Chart performance 
"Reach 4 Me" debuted at number 29 on the US Billboard Adult R&B Songs in the week of August 18, 2018. In its second week on the chart, "Reach 4 Me" rose to number 28. In the week ending September 8, 2018, "Reach 4 Me" re-entered the chart at number 22, where it remained the following week. For the week ending September 22, 2018, "Reach 4 Me" peaked at number 20. The week of September 29, 2018, "Reach 4 Me" reached a new peak of 19. The week of October 13, 2018, "Reach 4 Me" peaked at number 18 on the Adult R&B Songs chart. The following week of October 20, 2018, "Reach 4 Me" reached a new peak of number 16 on the Adult R&B Songs chart.

Promotion
A lyric video for "Reach 4 Me" premiered online on November 16, 2018.

Credits and personnel
Credits adapted from AllMusic.

Dwayne Abernathy – composition
Rhona Bennett – composition
Dem Jointz – engineering, production
Terry Ellis – composition
Koen Heldens – mixing
Cindy Herron – composition
Isabella Peschardt – composition

Charts

References 

2018 songs
En Vogue songs
Songs written by Dem Jointz